Wayne Earl Arendse (born 25 November 1984) is a South African retired soccer defender. He played for Engen Santos for six years before joining Mamelodi Sundowns in July 2012.

He hails from Mitchell's Plain on the Cape Flats.

International career
He made his debut for South Africa in 2012 and was capped once.

References

External links

1984 births
Living people
Sportspeople from Cape Town
Cape Coloureds
South African soccer players
Association football defenders
Santos F.C. (South Africa) players
Mamelodi Sundowns F.C. players
South Africa international soccer players
South African Premier Division players